The Full Monty is a 1997 British comedy film.

The Full Monty may also refer to:

 The Full Monty (soundtrack), the soundtrack from the film
 The Full Monty, a 1998 novelization of the film by Wendy Holden (author, born 1961)
 The Full Monty (musical), a 2000 musical based on the film
 The Full Monty (play), a 2013 play based on the film
 The full monty, a British slang phrase